Elections were held in the Australian state of Western Australia on 10 May 1958 to elect 10 of the 30 members of the state's Legislative Council.

Results

Legislative Council

|}

Retiring Members

 No sitting MLC's retired at this election.

Candidates

Election results

Central

Metropolitan

Midland

North

North-East 

 Preferences were not distributed.

South

South-East

South-West

Suburban

 Preferences were not distributed.

West

See also

 Members of the Western Australian Legislative Council, 1958–1960

References

1958 elections in Australia
Elections in Western Australia